Antônio Adriano Teles Junior (born on September 2, 1982) is a Brazilian footballer.

References

External links

1982 births
Association football midfielders
Brazilian expatriate footballers
Brazilian expatriate sportspeople in Indonesia
Brazilian footballers
Expatriate footballers in Indonesia
Liga 1 (Indonesia) players
Living people
Persiba Balikpapan players
PSSB Bireuen players
PSIS Semarang players
Persiraja Banda Aceh players
Persita Tangerang players
Pro Duta FC players
Kalteng Putra F.C. players
Footballers from Rio de Janeiro (city)